Ruth Austin Knox (born June 18, 1953 in Augusta, Georgia) was the president of Wesleyan College, located in Macon, Georgia.  She was installed as 
Wesleyan's twenty-fourth president in 2003 and served until mid-2017.  A 1975 graduate (as a Golden Heart), she is Wesleyan's first alumna president and its second woman president.

Before becoming president, Knox was a lawyer in private practice in Atlanta, Georgia.  She is a 1978 graduate of the University of Georgia School of Law, magna cum laude, Phi Beta Kappa, and Order of the Coif.  From 1985-1988, she was president of the Wesleyan Alumnae Association.  She chaired the Alumnae Campaign to fund teaching chairs for the College from 1990-1993, and became a member of the Board of Trustees in 1993.  Knox became chairman in 1994, and served in that position until she was appointed acting president in May 2002.

References 

1953 births
People from Augusta, Georgia
Heads of universities and colleges in the United States
Living people
University of Georgia School of Law alumni
Wesleyan College alumni